The Siberian Elm cultivar Ulmus pumila 'Park Royal' is a cold-hardy selection raised by the Sheridan Nursery, Toronto, Ontario, Canada.

Description
The tree was briefly described by the Sheridan Nursery in its Trade List of Spring 1969, as an "improved specimen, fast growing". It has upright branches, with dark green foliage turning yellow in autumn.

Pests and diseases
See under Ulmus pumila.

Cultivation
'Park Royal' is not known to be in cultivation beyond Canada.

Accessions
Dominion Arboretum, Ottawa, Ontario, Canada. No acc. details.
University of Guelph Arboretum, Canada. Two trees: acc. no. 1975-0487, 1989-0279

Nurseries

North America

Quebec Multiplants, Quebec, Canada.

References

Siberian elm cultivar
Ulmus articles missing images
Ulmus